Fire Wire is an album by Larry Carlton that was released in 2006. It received a nomination for Best Pop Instrumental Album at the 49th Annual Grammy Awards which took place in 2007.

Track listing 
 "Inkblot 11 – 3:18
 "Double Cross – 4:36
 "Naked Truth" – 3:49
 "Surrender" – 5:01
 "Big Trouble" – 3:42
 "Goodbye" – 4:40
 "Dirty Donna's House Party" – 5:37
 "The Prince" – 4:35
 "Sunrise" – 5:11
 "Mean Street" – 6:48

Personnel
 Larry Carlton – guitar
 Mike Haynes – trumpet
 Barry Green – trombone
 Mark Douthit – saxophone
 Doug Moffet – baritone saxophone
 Jeff Babko – keyboards
 Michael Rhodes – bass guitar
 Matt Chamberlain – drums

References

2005 albums
Larry Carlton albums
Bertelsmann Music Group albums
Albums recorded at Capitol Studios